Seno Tsuhah is a primary school teacher and Indigenous social activist from the Chakhesang Naga community in Chizami, Nagaland. She is widely recognised in Northeast India for her work on gender justice, sustainable farming, and teaching pedagogy. She has been associated with the feminist organisation, North East Network (NEN), for over twenty years.

Early life 
As part of Chizami Students' Union, Tsuhah was involved in community activities such as sanitation and cleanliness drives, village tree plantation, and literacy programmes. After her college studies, she returned to her native village of Chizami to further her community activism through church, women's groups, and society. She met Monisha Behal in Pfütsero at one of the training programmes of North East Network (NEN) in 1996. Tsuhah officially joined NEN in 1998.

Gender Justice 
Over the decades, Tsuhah's work with the Chizami Women Society and North East Network has witnessed women taking leadership roles in their respective communities. More women have become economically independent through livelihood programmes. After eight years of her efforts, Tsuhah managed to convince Chizami village council to women deserved equal wages in unskilled labour. In 2014, the council passed a resolution decreeing equal wages for women agricultural labourers on par with men. The following year, two women were selected to become members of the council. In the highly patriarchal Naga society, the Chizami village council continues to be one of very few that have women as active members.

Indigenous farming 
Since the late 2000s, Tsuhah has been advocating for return to Indigenous cultivation practices with traditionally grown crops, such as millets. She believes that these are critical in coping with effects of climate change in Nagaland. Indigenous  elders in Chizami and neighbouring villages believe that millets can grow in harsh conditions with little fertilisers or other inputs. Under her leadership, this led the Chizami Women Society to set up a seed bank starting with fifteen varieties of traditional millet varieties. Tsuhah represented the Chakhesang Naga community at the 2009 United Nations Climate Change Conference in Copenhagen to present the climate community charter organised by different groups from India.

On various fora, Tsuhah has asserted the role of Indigenous women in local farming practices as well as preserving biodiversity. On the occasion of International Women's Day in 2017, she renewed her call for recognising the Indigenous way of life,Let us acknowledge their [women's]work by using this platform to relook, rethink and restrategise to recognise the contributions of women and men farmers practicing ecological agriculture in our communities.Tsuhah also prominently focuses on women's role in crop selection and seed selection and preservation.

Pedagogy 
Tsuhah was instrumental in started the Participatory Video (PV) hub in Chizami to further engage and mobilise communities for social transformation in Nagaland. Here PV documents Indigenous knowledge systems, lifestyles, biodiversity, and Indigenous relationship with nature, food and culture. These videos are largely made by women filmmakers from the community. Over the years, the team has also focused on documented gender-based violence, women's participation in decision making, and women change makers in the community. By recording in the Khezha language of the Chakhesang Naga community, these movies aim at furthering the dialogue towards justice, peace, and sustainability.

Awards 
In September 2020, Tsuhah was conferred the 13th Peace Channel Award in Dimapur for her contributions towards women rights, good governance, natural resource management, and sustainable livelihood. In her acceptance speech, Tsuhah acknowledged the women with whom she has travelled throughout the years, especially women farmers, artisans, vendors, elders, and custodian knowledge holders. This was followed by the Naturenomics award in December 2020 conferred by the Balipara Foundation that recognised her pioneering work with Chizami Weaves. In her acceptance, she dedicated the award to the weavers who are also farmers who further "become more active and participate in community works in their own village and through this work it has 'visible-lined' the contribution of women." She stated that the award acknowledges the work on sustainable livelihood through textile weaving.

References 

Naga people
Women from Nagaland
Living people
People from Phek district
Year of birth missing (living people)